Polymetal International plc is an Anglo-Russian precious mining company registered in Saint Helier, Jersey. It is listed on the London Stock Exchange and Moscow Exchange.

History
Polymetal Group of companies was founded in 1998 in Saint Petersburg by Alexander Nesis of ICT Group and since then it has built a portfolio of gold and silver mines in Russia, Kazakhstan and Armenia. In October 2011, Polymetal successfully completed the placing of £491m of shares on the London Stock Exchange, valuing the company at £3.55bn and making it the first Russian-founded company to obtain a premium listing at the LSE. In December 2011 Polymetal International became one of the first two Russian-originated companies to be included in the FTSE 100 Index. In 2016, Polymetal was ranked as the 9th best of 92 oil, gas, and mining companies on indigenous rights in the Arctic.

Operations
 
In 2021, Polymetal produced 1.4 million ounces of gold, 20.4 million ounces of silver and 1,900 tons of copper.

Polymetal owns mines and carries out exploration activities in six regions of Russia (the Magadan Region, the Khabarovsk Territory, the Sverdlovsk Region, the Chukotka Autonomous Okrug, Republic of Karelia and Sakha Republic), Kazakhstan and Armenia. Its portfolio of projects contains 36 licences covering a territory of over 7,800 km2. The Group organises its operations into six operational units, which are categorised into centralised processing hubs and stand-alone mines.

In November 2021, Polymetal invested US$447 million in the Veduga goldfield in Krasnoyarsk Krai; the company's share of the project was 59.4%. In December 2021, the Federal Antimonopoly Service approved the consolidation of Polymetal's investment in the Veduga project, allowing the company to buy the other 40.6% that it did not already own.

In March 2022, Polymetal consolidated its 100% investment in the Novopetrovskoye Polymetal field in Bashkortostan, after its purchase of 25% of the field from the Rosgeologia exploration company and its prior acquisition of 75% of the field in 2020.

Hubs:

The Dukat hub consists of the Omsukchan concentrator, which processes ore from the Dukat and Goltsovoye mines, and the Lunnoye processing plant, which processes ore from the Lunnoye and Arylakh mines, as well as concentrate from the Omsukchan concentrator.
The Amursk hub is Polymetal's largest project. It comprises two high-grade refractory gold deposits, Albazino and Mayskoye, the Amursk hydrometallurgical plant, the Albazino concentrator and the Mayskoye concentrator. First gold was poured at the Amursk POX facility in April 2012.
The Omolon hub consists of the Kubaka processing plant, which processes ore from the Birkachan mine and is expected to serve as a centralised processing facility for the operating Sopka mine, and other new mines.

Stand-alone mines:

The Voro stand-alone mine consists of the main production site with two open-pit mines and two processing facilities.  It is also currently processing ore from two small satellite mines.
The Khakanja stand-alone mine consists of the main production site with open-pit mines and a processing plant. It is also currently processing ore from a small satellite mine and a trial mine at one of the advanced exploration projects.
The Varvara stand-alone mine, located in Kazakhstan, consists of a production site with an open-pit mine and a processing plant.  The Company believes that due to its scale, location and transportation infrastructure, Varvara has the potential to become a processing hub in the future, treating ore from other deposits in the surrounding region.

Ownership
As of 31 December 2021, Polymetal International plc had a free float of 75.2%. Most of the remainder (23.9%) was owned by ICT group whose major shareholder was Alexander Nesis. The family of the late Czech businessman Petr Kellner owned 3.3% via PPF Group.

Carbon footprint
Polymetal reported Total CO2e emissions (Direct + Indirect) for 31 December 2020 at 1,103 Kt (-95 /-7.9% y-o-y).

References

External links
 Official Polymetal International website

Mining companies of Russia
Mining companies of the United Kingdom
Companies based in Saint Petersburg
Non-renewable resource companies established in 1998
1998 establishments in Russia
2011 initial public offerings
Companies listed on the London Stock Exchange
Companies listed on the Moscow Exchange